Josiah Dennis Coleman (born November 3, 1972) is a justice of the Mississippi Supreme Court.

Early life and education 
Justice Coleman grew up in Choctaw County, near Ackerman, and graduated valedictorian from Ackerman High School. He graduated cum laude from the University of Mississippi with a Bachelor of Arts degree in history and philosophy. He earned his Juris Doctor degree from the University of Mississippi School of Law. In 2020, Coleman received his LLM in judicial studies from Duke Law School.

Law career 
After law school, he served for almost two years as a law clerk for U.S. Magistrate Judge S. Allan Alexander in Oxford. Before joining the Supreme Court of Mississippi, he practiced law for 12 years, first in Tupelo, then in Oxford. His practice concentrated on defense litigation and appellate advocacy in the areas of insurance, product liability and professional malpractice.

Coleman is the grandson of J.P. Coleman, who served as Governor of Mississippi, as a judge on the U.S. Court of Appeals for the Fifth Circuit, and briefly as a justice of the Mississippi Supreme Court, resigning to accept appointment as state attorney general. Thomas Coleman, Josiah Coleman's father, was one of the original members of the Mississippi Court of Appeals when the intermediate appellate court began in 1995.

Supreme Court of Mississippi 
Coleman, who was endorsed by the Republican Party, won his election to the Mississippi Supreme Court comfortably in 2012. On November 3, 2020, voters elected him to a second term.

In 2021, Coleman wrote the majority decision that struck down a voter-approved medical marijuana ballot initiative. Coleman argued that the ballot initiative because the state constitution said ballot initiatives had to have a certain number of signatures from Mississippi's five districts; however, Mississippi lost one of its districts in the 2000 census, so ballot signatures were only collected in the four remaining districts. Coleman wrote that the drafters of the constitutional provision "wrote a ballot-initiative process that cannot work in a world where Mississippi has fewer than five representatives in Congress." The implications of the decision is that the Supreme Court effectively rolled back the ability to conduct ballot initiatives; at the time, ballot initiatives on allowing early and expanding Medicaid were being considered.

References

External links
Official biography from Supreme Court of Mississippi

1972 births
Living people
Justices of the Mississippi Supreme Court
University of Mississippi School of Law alumni
Place of birth missing (living people)
University of Mississippi alumni
People from Ackerman, Mississippi
21st-century American judges